O'Connor is a surname of Irish origin. It is derived from the Gaelic Ó Conchobhair (descendant of Conchobar "lover of hounds"). A modern Irish variant spelling is Ó Conchúir. 

Historically, the O'Conor were the foremost Connacht clan.

List of people with the surname O'Connor

Medieval kings
Cathal Crobhdearg Ua Conchobair (1153–1224), King of Connacht
Conchobar Máenmaige Ua Conchobhair (died 1189) last independent King of Connacht

Ruaidhrí Ó Conchobhair (died 1198), last High King of Ireland (also known as Rory O'Connor)
Toirdealbhach Mac Ruaidhrí Ó Conchobhair (1088–1156), High King of Ireland (also known as Turlough O'Connor)

Arts
Alexander James O'Connor, more known as Rex Orange County (born 1998), British singer-songwriter
Brian O'Connor, American bassist
Caroline O'Connor (born 1962), Australian singer, dancer and actress
Carroll O'Connor (1924–2001), American actor
Celeste O'Connor (born 1998), American actress
Claudio O'Connor (born 1963), Argentinian singer
Denis O'Connor (born 1947), New Zealand ceramicist, sculptor and writer
Des O'Connor (1932–2020), British singer and TV Comedian
Donald O'Connor (1925–2003), American actor and entertainer
Elmo O'Connor (born 1994), American rapper and singer known as BONES, founder of TeamSESH.
Ella Marija Lani Yelich-O'Connor, more known as Lorde (born 1996), New Zealand singer-songwriter
Flannery O'Connor (1925–1964), American author
Frank O'Connor (1903–1966), Irish author
Frank O'Connor (1881–1959), American actor, director, and screenwriter
Frank O'Connor (Charles Francis O'Connor) (1897–1979), American actor and husband of Ayn Rand
Gavin O'Connor (born 1964), American film director, screenwriter, producer, playwright and actor
Gavin O'Connor (born 1972), Irish actor
Hazel O'Connor (born 1955), English singer and actress
James O'Connor, American drummer
Joe O'Connor, American actor
Josef O'Connor, artist
Joseph O'Connor (born 1963), Irish novelist
Mark O'Connor (born 1961), American fiddler
Raymond O'Connor (born 1952), American character actor
Renee O'Connor (born 1971), American actress
Ruairi O'Connor (born 1991), Irish actor
Sinéad O'Connor (born 1966), Irish singer-songwriter
Una O'Connor (1880–1959), Irish character actress
O'Connor, Argentinian band

Law and politics
Arthur O'Connor (1763–1852), United Irishman and later a general in Napoleon's army
Basil O'Connor (1892–1972), American lawyer, co-founded National Foundation for Infantile Paralysis with Franklin D. Roosevelt
Batt O'Connor, Irish builder, who worked for the revolutionary Michael Collins
Bob O'Connor (mayor) (1944–2006), Mayor of Pittsburgh, Pennsylvania
Dennis O'Connor, Associate Chief Justice of Ontario
Edmund O'Connor (1848–1898), President pro tem of the NY State Senate 1895
Feargus O'Connor (1794–1855), Irish Chartist leader
Frank O'Connor (1903–1966), Canadian politician
Frank D. O'Connor (1909–1992), New York politician
Gavan O'Connor (born 1947), Australian politician
Gordon O'Connor (born 1939), Canadian politician
James O'Connor (1870–1941), American politician
Jeremiah F. O'Connor (1933–2010), American politician
Jerry L. O'Connor (born 1953), American politician
John O'Connor (1824–1887), Canadian politician
Joseph O'Connor, Irish author
Joseph O'Connor, Irish revolutionary, soldier and politician
Joseph O'Conor (1916–2001), Irish actor
Judith G. O'Connor (born 1936), American politician
Justice O'Connor (disambiguation), various people
Sir Kenneth O'Connor (1896–1985), British Judge
Larry O'Connor (born 1956), Canadian politician
Máireag Bean Uí Conchobhair Fáilghe, (died 1451), Queen, and patron of the arts
Maureen O'Connor (born 1951), Lieutenant Governor of Ohio and member of the Ohio Supreme Court
Maureen O'Connor (born 1946), Mayor of San Diego, California, from 1985 to 1992
Matt O'Connor, founder of the fathers' rights pressure group Fathers 4 Justice
Michael O'Connor (1865–1940), Australian politician
Patrick J. O'Connor, Chicago alderman
Ray O'Connor (1926–2013), 22nd Premier of Western Australia, convicted fraudster and Australian rules footballer
Richard O'Connor (1851–1912), Australian politician and jurist
Sandra Day O'Connor (born 1930), Associate Justice of the United States Supreme Court
T.P. O'Connor (1848–1929), Irish journalist and politician
Terence O'Connor (1891–1940), British politician

Military
Bryan D. O'Connor (born 1946), astronaut
Francis Burdett O'Connor was an officer in the Irish Legion of Simón Bolívar's army in Venezuela.
Luke O'Connor (1831–1915), first recipient of the Victoria Cross and British General
Sir Richard O'Connor (1889–1981), British General
Rory O'Connor, Irish revolutionary soldier, who commanded Four Courts garrison

Religion
Denis T. O'Connor (1841–1911), Roman Catholic Archbishop of Toronto
James O'Connor (bishop) (1823–1891), Bishop of the Roman Catholic Diocese of Omaha
John O'Connor (cardinal) (1920–1999), Roman Catholic Archbishop of New York City
Michael O'Connor, Bishop of the Roman Catholic Diocese of Pittsburgh
Patrick Edward O'Connor (1932–2014), New Zealand Roman Catholic priest
William Patrick O'Connor, Bishop of the Roman Catholic Diocese of Superior (1942–1946)

Science and academia
Annette O'Connor, professor and researcher in health care
C. Y. O'Connor (1843–1902), Irish engineer
David O'Connor, Australian Egyptologist
J. Dennis O'Connor, American academic administrator
Johnson O'Connor (1891–1973), American psychometrician
Michael Patrick O'Connor (1950–2007), American linguist
 Thomas H. O'Connor (1923–2012), American historian

Sport
Adrian O'Connor (born 1978), Irish backstroke swimmer
Cian O'Connor (born 1979), Irish equestrian

Brian O'Connor, University of Virginia baseball head coach
Christy O'Connor Jnr (1948–2016), Irish golfer
Christy O'Connor Snr (1924–2016), Irish golfer; uncle of Christy Jnr
Dan O'Connor (baseball) (1868–1942), Canadian baseball player
D'Arcy O'Connor (1994), English footballer
David O'Connor (equestrian) (born 1962), American equestrian
Denise O'Connor (born 1935), American Olympic fencer
Donncha O'Connor (born 1981), Cork All Ireland Senior Medalist
Drew O'Connor (born 1998), American ice hockey player
Fred O'Connor (born 1939), American football player
Fred O'Connor (soccer) (1902–1952), American soccer player
Gary O'Connor (born 1974), Scottish football goalkeeper
Garry O'Connor (born 1983), Scottish footballer (Hibernian, Lokomotiv Moscow, Birmingham City, Scotland)
Georgia O'Connor, English boxer
James O'Connor (rugby) (born 1990), Australian rugby union player
Jamesie O'Connor (born 1971), Irish hurler
Jennifer O'Connor (netball) (born 1984), Australian netball player
Joe O'Connor (born 1995) English snooker player
Karen O'Connor (born 1958), American equestrian
Kieran O'Connor (1979–2020), Gaelic footballer
Mary O'Connor (athlete) (born 1955), New Zealand long-distance runner
Michael O'Connor (baseball player) (born 1980), Major League Baseball player
Michael O'Connor (rugby) (born 1960), Australian rugby union and rugby league player
Patrick O'Connor, Jamaican sprinter
Pat O'Connor (American football) (born 1993), American football player
Pat O'Connor (racing driver) (1928–1958), Formula One driver
Paul O'Connor, Irish Gaelic footballer
Paul O'Connor, Irish skier
Peter O'Connor (athlete) (1872–1957), Irish athlete
Red O'Connor, American football player
Tommy O'Connor, Irish footballer
Tony O'Connor, Irish rower
William Joseph O'Connor (1862–1892), Canadian professional oarsman

Other
Brendan O'Connor, multiple people
Daniel O'Connor, multiple people
Erin O'Connor (born 1978), British supermodel
 Francis V. O'Connor (1937–2017), American art historian
Kevin O'Connor, multiple people
Liam O'Connor, multiple people
Michael O'Connor (disambiguation), multiple people
Patricia O'Connor, multiple people
Terry O'Connor, multiple people
Thomas Burton O'Connor (1914–1952), American journalist & editor
Tom O'Connor, multiple people
Tony O'Connor, headteacher

Fictional characters
O'Connor, the name of O'Brien in the 1956 film adaptation of Nineteen Eighty-Four
Enoch O'Connor, the name of a side character in Ransom Rigg's book series 'Miss Peregrine's Home For Peculiar Children' who possesses the ability to resurrect the dead via inanimate objects.

Similar names
O'Conner
Conner (surname)
Connor (surname)
Connors (surname)
Conor
O'Conor Don
O Connor Sligo

External links
 O'Connor Clan of Ireland

English-language surnames
Surnames of Irish origin
Anglicised Irish-language surnames